

Group A

Head coach:  Václav Ježek

Head coach:  Olatunde Disu

Head coach:  Carlos Queiroz

Head coach:  José Roberto Avila

Group B

Head coach:  Juan José Pelaez

Head coach:  Juan José Gámez

Head coach:  Bakhadir Ibrahimov

Head coach:  Boris Ignatyev

Group C

Head coach:  Renê Simões

Head coach:  Lothar Priebe

Head coach:  Idrissa Touré

Head coach:  Bob Gansler

Group D

Head coach:  Carlos Oscar Pachamé

 Apart from the two goalkeepers who were assigned numbers 1 & 12, this squad was numbered in alphabetical order of player surname.

Head coach:  Anwar Jassam

Head coach:  Svein Ivar Sigernes

Head coach:  Chus Pereda

References 

 FIFA pages on 1989 World Youth Cup

Fifa World Youth Championship Squads, 1989
FIFA U-20 World Cup squads